Brush Creek Township is an inactive township in Wright County, in the U.S. state of Missouri.

Brush Creek Township was erected in 1841, taking its name from a creek of the same name within its borders.

References

Townships in Missouri
Townships in Wright County, Missouri